Mariusz Wysocki (born 3 June 1976 in Poland) is a Polish retired footballer.

References

Polish footballers
Living people
1976 births
Association football defenders
OKS Stomil Olsztyn players
Świt Nowy Dwór Mazowiecki players
KSZO Ostrowiec Świętokrzyski players